The Oyster card is a payment method for public transport in London (and certain areas around it) in England, United Kingdom. A standard Oyster card is a blue credit-card-sized stored-value contactless smart card. It is promoted by Transport for London (TfL) and can be used on travel modes across London including London Buses, London Underground, the Docklands Light Railway (DLR), London Overground, Tramlink, some river boat services, and most National Rail services within the London fare zones. Since its introduction in June 2003, more than 86 million cards have been used.

Oyster cards can hold period tickets; travel permits and; most commonly, credit for travel ("Pay as you go"), which must be added to the card before travel. Passengers touch it on an electronic reader when entering and leaving the transport system in order to validate it and deduct funds from the stored credit. Cards may be "topped-up" by continuous payment authority, by online purchase, at credit card terminals or by cash, the last two methods at stations or ticket offices. The card is designed to reduce the number of transactions at ticket offices and the number of paper tickets. Usage is encouraged by offering substantially cheaper fares than with cash though the acceptance of cash is being phased out. On London buses, cash is no longer accepted.

The card was first issued to the public on 30 June 2003, with a limited range of features and there continues to be a phased introduction of further functions. By June 2012, over 43 million Oyster cards had been issued and more than 80% of all journeys on public transport in London were made using the card.

From September 2007 to 2010, the Oyster card functionality was experimented on Barclaycard contactless bank cards. Since 2014, the use of Oyster cards has been supplemented by contactless credit and debit cards as part of TfL's "Future Ticketing Programme". TfL was one of the first public transport providers in the world to accept payment by contactless bank cards, after, in Europe, the tramways and bus of Nice on 21 May 2010 either with NFC bank card or smartphone, and the widespread adoption of contactless in London has been credited to this. TfL is now one of Europe's largest contactless merchants, with around 1 in 10 contactless transactions in the UK taking place on the TfL network.

Background

Precursor 
Early electronic smartcard ticket technology was developed in the 1980s, and the first smartcard was tested by London Transport on bus route 212 from Chingford to Walthamstow in 1992. The trial showed that the technology was possible and that it would reduce boarding times. In February 1994, the "Smartcard" or "Smart Photocard" was launched and trialled in Harrow on 21 routes. Advertised as "the new passport to Harrow’s buses", the trial was the largest of its kind in the world, costing £2 million and resulting in almost 18,000 photocards issued to the Harrow public. It lasted until December 1995 and was a success, proving that it reduces boarding times, is easy to use, and is able to record entry and exit stops and calculate the corresponding fare fee, i.e. pay as you go.

However, the Upass smartcard of the South Korean capital Seoul would eventually be the first in the world to roll out this sort of technology, at the end of 1995, eight years before London would as the "Oyster card". In the UK, the first smartcard publicly rolled out was the BusCard in the city of Nottingham in 2000.

Operator 
The Oyster card was set up under a Private Finance Initiative (PFI) contract between Transport for London (TfL) and TranSys, a consortium of suppliers that included EDS and Cubic Transportation Systems (responsible for day-to-day management) and Fujitsu and WS Atkins (shareholders with no active involvement). The £100 million contract was signed in 1998 for a term of 17 years until 2015 at a total cost of £1.1 billion.

In August 2008, TfL decided to exercise a break option in the contract to terminate it in 2010, five years early. This followed a number of technical failures. TfL stated that the contractual break was to reduce costs, not connected to the system failures. In November 2008 a new contract was announced between TfL and Cubic and EDS for two of the original consortium shareholders to run the system from 2010 until 2013.

Brand 
The Oyster name was agreed on after a lengthy period of research managed by TranSys and agreed by TfL. Two other names were considered and "Oyster" was chosen as a fresh approach that was not directly linked to transport, ticketing or London. Other proposed names were "Pulse" and "Gem". According to Andrew McCrum, now of Appella brand name consultants, who was brought in to find a name by Saatchi and Saatchi Design (contracted by TranSys), "Oyster was conceived ... because of the metaphorical implications of security and value in the hard bivalve shell and the concealed pearl. Its associations with London through Thames estuary oyster beds and the major relevance of the popular idiom "the world is your oyster" were also significant factors in its selection".

The intellectual property rights to the Oyster brand originally belonged to TranSys. Following the renegotiation of the operating contract in 2008, TfL sought to retain the right to use the Oyster brand after the termination of its partnership with Transys, eventually acquiring the rights to the brand in 2010 at a cost of £1 million.

Technology 

The Oyster card has a claimed proximity range of about 80 mm (3 inches). The card operates as a RFID system and is compatible with ISO/IEC 14443 types A and B. Oyster readers can also read other types of cards including Cubic Transportation Systems' Go cards. From its inception until January 2010, Oyster cards were based on NXP/Philips' MIFARE Classic 1k chips provided by Giesecke & Devrient, Gemalto and SchlumbergerSema. All new Oyster cards have used MIFARE DESFire EV1 chips since December 2009. From February 2010, MIFARE Classic-based Oyster cards were no longer issued. MIFARE DESFire cards are now widely used as transport smartcards.

MIFARE Classic chips, on which the original Oyster card was based, are hard-wired logic smartcards, meaning that they have limited computing power designed for a specific task. The MIFARE DESFire chips used on the new Oyster card are CPUs with much more sophisticated security features and more complex computation power. They are activated only when they are in an electromagnetic field compatible with ISO/IEC 14443 type A, provided by Oyster readers. The readers read information from the cards, calculate whether to allow travel, assess any fare payable and write back information to the card. Some basic information about the MIFARE Classic or MIFARE DESFire chip can be read by any ISO/IEC 14443 type A compatible reader, but Oyster-specific information cannot be read without access to the encryption used for the Oyster system. While it has been suggested that a good reader could read personal details from a distance, there has been no evidence of anyone being able to decrypt Oyster information. By design the cards do not carry any personal information. Aluminium shielding has been suggested to prevent any personal data from being read.

Oyster uses a distributed settlement framework. All transactions are settled between the card and reader alone. Readers transmit the transactions to the back office in batches but there is no need for this to be done in real time. The back office acts mainly as a record of transactions that have been completed between cards and readers. This provides a high degree of resilience.

In 2008, a fashion caught on for removing the RFID chip from Oyster cards and attaching it to wrist watches and bracelets. This allowed commuters to pass through the gates by "swiping" their hand without the need to take out a proper card. Although the RFID chips were charged in the normal way and no fare evasion was involved, TfL disapproved of the practice and threatened to fine anyone not carrying a full undamaged card, although it is not clear what the actual offence would be, were a case to be brought.

Architecture 
The Oyster system is based on a closed, proprietary architecture from Cubic Transportation Systems. The card readers were developed entirely by Cubic, whereas development of the back office systems was started by Fujitsu and completed by Cubic. The system has the capability to interface with equipment or services provided by other suppliers. The Oyster website is not part of the closed system but interfaces with it. Similarly, Oyster readers are now embedded into ticket machines produced by Shere and Scheidt and Bachmann on the national rail network.

In early 2007, TfL and Deloitte worked to migrate the on-line payment systems to a more open architecture, using a number of open source components such as Linux, to resolve issues of lock-in costs, updates, incorporation of new security standards of PCI DSS, non-scalability, low and inconsistent quality of service, and slower response time to business changes.

Features

Registration and protection 

Oyster cards can be registered or protected for loss or theft. Full registration can be done at a London Underground station, an Oyster Ticket Stop (shop) or a Travel Information Centre: an Oyster registration form must be filled in (either at time of purchase or subsequently). Registration enables the customer to buy any product for the card and to have an after-sales service, and it protects against theft or loss. The customer has to supply a Security Answer: either their mother's maiden name, memorable date or memorable place.
All adult Oyster cards purchased online or by phone are fully registered. (This does not include Visitor Oyster cards.)

Oyster cards obtained at stations or shops cannot be fully registered online. However, cards can be protected online by setting up an Oyster online account and linking the card to that account. This allows for a full protection against theft or loss, but the Oyster card will be able to hold only 7-day season tickets and pay-as-you-go.

Sales 

Oyster cards can be purchased from a number of different outlets in the London area:
 Ticket machines at London Underground stations, which accept banknotes, coins, and credit and debit cards.
 London Overground & TfL Rail ticket offices
 Online, using the TfL website
 Through the TfL app
 Selected National Rail stations, some of which are also served by London Underground
 Travel Information Centres
 About 4,000 Oyster Ticket Stop agents (usually newsagent's shops)
 By telephone sales from TfL.

Visitor Oyster cards can be obtained from Visit Britain outlets around the world, and from other transport operators, such as EasyJet and Gatwick Express, and online and from any ticket office. However, these limited-functionality cards cannot be registered. A £5 deposit is required which will be refunded in cash upon return of the card. Any remaining credit on the card is refundable as well.

The cards were originally free, but a refundable deposit of £3 was subsequently introduced,
increased to £5 for a refundable Oyster card in January 2011. The deposit and any unused credit is refundable by posting the card to TfL; however, refunds are paid only by pounds sterling cheque, bank transfer to a UK bank account, credit to another Oyster card, or a TfL web account voucher, and refunds of over £15 require the customer to provide proof of identity and address. Refunds of up to £10 in credit plus the deposit may be claimed at London Underground ticket machines, which will pay the refund in cash. Even though the £5 deposit is officially for the card itself, the ticket machine has no facility for relieving the customer of the card who departs the transaction still in possession of a (now useless) Oyster card. On cards issued since February 2020, the £5 deposit has become a card fee and will be repaid as credit to the card on the first transaction made more than a year after issue; it is no longer repayable. This is to encourage retention of cards.

A registration form can be obtained at or after the time of purchase, which if not completed restricts the Oyster card to Pay-as-you-go and weekly tickets.

Ticket vending machines on most National Rail stations will top-up Oyster cards and sell tickets that can be loaded on to Oyster. New Oyster cards are not available at most National Rail stations and termini. At several main line termini, TfL runs Travel Information Centres, which do sell Oyster.

Reporting 

Touch-screen ticket machines report the last eight journeys and last top-up amount. The same information is available as a print-out from ticket offices, and also on board London Buses by request. The balance is displayed on some Underground barriers at the end of journeys that have caused a debit from the balance, and can also be requested at newsagents and National Rail stations that provide a top-up facility.

Oyster Online service can also deliver regular Travel Statements via email.

A complete 8-week 'touch' history can be requested from TfL: for registered and protected Oyster cards, TfL can provide the history for the previous 8 weeks, but no further back.
Oyster online also displays up to 8 weeks of journey history.

Use

Touching in and out 
Travellers touch the card on a distinctive yellow circular reader (a Tri-Reader, developed by Cubic Transportation Systems) on the automated barriers at London Underground stations to 'touch in' and 'touch out' at the start and end of a journey. Physical contact is not necessary, but the range of the reader is only a few millimetres. Tram stops have readers on the platforms, and buses also have readers on the driver/conductor's ticket machine, and on these modes passengers must touch their card to the reader at the start of their journey only. Most Docklands Light Railway stations and occasionally London Underground stations such as at Waterloo (for the Waterloo & City line) do not have automatic barriers; hence, passengers must touch their card on a reader at both the beginning and end of their journey if they wish to avoid being charged the maximum fare for an unresolved journey. Such a step is not needed if transferring between trains within a station.

Season tickets 

Oyster cards can be used to store season tickets of both travelcards and bus passes (of one week or more), and a Pay-as-you-go balance.

An Oyster card can hold up to three season tickets at the same time. Season tickets are Bus & Tram Passes or Travelcards lasting 7 days, 1 month, or any duration up to one year (annual).

There is no essential difference in validity or cost between a 7-day, monthly or longer period Travelcard on Oyster and one on a traditional paper ticket; they are valid on all Underground, Overground, DLR, bus, tram and national rail services within the zones purchased. See the main article for a fuller explanation of Travelcards. Tube, DLR and London Overground Travelcards may be used on buses in all zones. Trams may also be used if the travelcard includes Zones 3, 4, 5 or 6.

Although TfL asks all Oyster users to tap their card at entry/exit points of their journey, in practice Travelcard holders only need to "touch in" and "touch out" to operate ticket barriers or because they intend to travel outside the zones for which their Travelcard is valid. As long as the Travelcard holder stays within their permitted zones no fare will be deducted from the pay-as-you-go funds on the card. The Oyster system checks that the Travelcard is valid in the zones it is being used in.

Travel outside zones 
If users travel outside the valid zones of their Travelcard (but within Oyster payment zones), any remaining fare due may be deducted from their pay-as-you-go funds (see below for how this is calculated). From 22 May 2011, Oyster Extension Permits (OEPs) were no longer required. Before that date, users who travelled outside the zones of their Travelcard, and whose journey involved the use of a National Rail service, were required to set an OEP on their Oyster card before travelling, to ensure that they paid for the extra-zonal journey.

Renewals 

Oyster card Travelcards can be renewed at the normal sales points and ticket machines at London Underground or London Overground stations, Oyster Ticket Stop agents, or some National Rail stations. Travelcards can also be renewed online via the Oystercard website, or by telephone sales from TfL; users must then nominate a Tube or overground station where they will tap their card in order to charge the card with the funds or season ticket purchased. Alternatively a user can choose to automatically add either £20 or £40 every time the balance on the card falls below £20. Online purchases can be collected at any Oyster touch point (including buses) 30 minutes after purchase; the previous requirement to nominate a station at which to collect the top-up and wait until the next day has been removed.

Pay-as-you-go 
In addition to holding Travelcards and bus passes, Oyster cards can also be used as stored-value cards, holding electronic funds of money. Amounts are deducted from the card each time it is used, and the funds can be "recharged" when required. The maximum value that an Oyster card may hold is £90. This system is known as "pay as you go" (abbreviated PAYG), because instead of holding a season ticket, the user only pays at the point of use.

When Oyster cards were introduced, the PAYG system was initially named "pre pay", and this name is still sometimes used by National Rail. TfL officially refers to the system as "pay as you go" in all publicity.

The validity of PAYG has a more complex history as it has only been gradually accepted by transport operators independent of TfL. Additionally, the use of PAYG differs across the various modes of transport in London, and passengers are sometimes required to follow different procedures to pay for their journey correctly.

It is possible to have a negative pay-as-you-go balance after completing a journey, but this will prevent the card from being used (even if it is loaded with a valid Travelcard) until the card is topped up.

Oyster route validators 
In 2009, TfL introduced a new type of Oyster card validator, distinguished from the standard yellow validators by having a pink-coloured reader. They do not deduct funds, but are used at peripheral interchange points to confirm journey details. Oyster pay-as-you-go users travelling between two points without passing through Zone 1 are eligible for a lower fare, and from 6 September 2009 can confirm their route by touching their Oyster cards on the pink validators when they change trains, allowing them to be charged the appropriate fare without paying for Zone 1 travel. The pink validators are located at 16 interchange stations.

 Gospel Oak
 Gunnersbury
 Highbury & Islington
 Kensington Olympia
 Rayners Lane
 Stratford
 West Brompton
 Willesden Junction
 Blackhorse Road
 Wimbledon
 Richmond
 Whitechapel
 Canada Water
 Surrey Quays (introduced September 2013)
 Clapham Junction (introduced September 2013)
 Ealing Broadway (introduced June 2022)

An example journey would be Watford Junction to Richmond, which  costs £5.00 peak and £3.10 off-peak when travelling via Zone 1. If travelling on a route outside Zone 1 via , the fares are £4.10 and £1.80 respectively, which can be charged correctly if the Oyster card is validated at the pink validator when changing trains at Willesden Junction.

Underground and DLR 

Oyster card pay-as-you-go users must "touch in" at the start of a journey by London Underground or DLR, and "touch out" again at the end. The Oyster card readers automatically calculate the correct fare based on the start and end points of the journey and deduct that fare from the Oyster card. Pay-as-you-go funds are also used to cover any additional fares due from season ticket holders who have travelled outside the valid zones of their season ticket (see Travelcards above).

Passengers enter or exit most London Underground stations through ticket barriers which are operated by scanning an Oyster card or inserting a valid ticket. Some tube stations (such as those at National Rail interchanges) and DLR stations have standalone validators with no barriers. In both instances, pay-as-you-go users are required to touch in and out.

London Overground 
London Overground services are operated by Arriva on behalf of TfL and Oyster pay-as-you-go users use their cards in the same way as on Underground journeys, touching their card on a card reader at the entry and exit points of their journey to calculate the fare due.

Buses 

Users must touch the Oyster card only once at the point of boarding: as London buses have a flat fare of £1.65 (which allows for unlimited bus journeys within 62 minutes from the point of touching in), there is no need to calculate an end point of the journey.

In July 2016, cash became a deprecated form of payment for travel on London Buses, with TfL heavily promoting the use of a contactless card or Oyster card. All major contactless cards are accepted which carry the 'contactless symbol', however tourists are advised to check with their bank before travel for validity details.

As London buses do not accept cash payments, TfL introduced a "one more journey" incentive on Oyster cards. This meant that customers are able to take a bus if their cards have £0 or more. Doing so may result in a negative balance, but the card can be topped up at a later date. When using the 'one more journey' feature, customers receive an emergency fare advice slip to acknowledge that the Oyster 'One More Journey' feature has been used and to remind them that their card needs to be topped up before another journey can be made. It is estimated that by eliminating cash from buses, TfL will save £103m by the year 2023, which will be reinvested into the capital.

Some London bus routes cross outside the Greater London boundary before reaching their terminus. Pay-as-you-go users are permitted to travel the full length of these route on buses operated as part of the London Bus network, even to destinations some distance outside Greater London.

Trams 

London's trams operate on the same fare structure as buses; the rules are similar, and users with pre-pay must touch the Oyster card only once at the point of boarding.

A more complex arrangement exists at Wimbledon station; tram passengers starting their journey there must pass through ticket gates in order to reach the tram platform, and therefore need to touch their Oyster card to open the barriers. They must then touch their Oyster card once again on the card reader on the Tramlink platform to confirm their journey as a tram passenger. Tram passengers arriving in Wimbledon must not touch out on the card reader on the Tramlink platform, but must touch-out to exit via the station gates. If the card is touched on the platform, the touch-out at the gate would be seen as a touch-in and cause the maximum fare to be charged to the card.

River 

Passengers boarding a Thames Clippers riverbus service must tap their Oyster card on the reader situated on the pier before boarding. Thames Clippers operates a pay-before-boarding policy.

London Cable Car 
Oyster cards are accepted on the London Cable Car route between Greenwich Peninsula and Royal Docks.  The cable car is outside of the London Travelcard validity. However, a 25% discount applies to Travelcard and Freedom Pass holders for both single and return journeys. The discount is automatically applied to Oyster card users, but only if their Travelcard is loaded onto their Oyster card. Freedom Pass holders and visitors in possession of ordinary magnetic stripe Travelcards have to buy a cash ticket if they wish to take advantage of the discount.

National Rail 

As with Underground and DLR journeys, Oyster PAYG users on National Rail must tap their card at the start and end of the journey to pay the correct fare. PAYG funds may also be used to cover any additional fares due from season ticket holders who have travelled outside the valid zones of their season ticket (see Travelcards above).

Many large National Rail stations in London have Oystercard-compatible barriers. At other smaller stations, users must touch the card on a standalone validator.

Out-of-station interchange
At a number of Tube, DLR, London Overground and National Rail stations which lie in close proximity, or where interchange requires passengers to pass through ticket barriers, an out-of-station interchange (OSI) is permitted. In such cases, the card holder touches out at one station and then touches in again before starting the next leg of the journey. The PAYG fares are then combined and charged as a single journey.

Examples include transferring between the Jubilee line at Canary Wharf and the DLR where Oyster card holders must tap their card at the ticket barriers in the Tube station, and then touch in on the validator at the DLR station. Balham (National Rail) to/from Balham (Tube) is another OSI, as is Camden Town (Tube) to/from Camden Road (London Overground). Failure to touch in or out on the validators in these circumstances will incur a maximum fare which is deducted from PAYG funds. In some cases (e.g. at West Hampstead NR stations) the OSI replicates interchanges which have existed for several decades before the invention of the Oyster system but were generally used with season tickets rather than day tickets.

Out-of-station interchanges can be temporary or permanent. A temporary arrangement may exist between two stations at short notice (routinely during weekend work but also when an emergency closure occurs). The two journeys that result are only charged as a single journey.

Recharging 
When the PAYG balance runs low, the balance can be topped up at the normal sales points or ticket machines at London Underground or London Overground stations, Oyster Ticket Stops or some National Rail stations. All ticket offices at stations run by London Underground will sell or recharge Oyster cards, or handle Oyster card refunds. However, some Tube stations are actually operated by National Rail train operating companies, and their ticket offices will not deal with Oyster refunds. DLR does not have any ticket offices which sell any Oyster card top-ups or handle refunds (as its stations are usually unmanned), except for the information office at London City Airport.

PAYG funds and Travel card season tickets (but not Bus & Tram Passes) can also be purchased online via the Oyster online website or by calling the Oyster helpline. The top up can be collected 30 mins later by touching in or out as part of a normal journey at any station or on any bus. There is no requirement to select a specific station nor to wait until the next day, which was the case in the past.

For further information on recharging and renewals, see the section on Renewals in this article.

Auto top-up 
Customers can set up and manage Auto top-up online for their existing Oyster card. They register a debit or credit card, make a PAYG top-up purchase (minimum £10) and select either £20 or £40 as the Auto top-up amount.
Alternatively, a new Oyster card with Auto top-up and a minimum of £10 pay as you go can be ordered via Oyster online.

There is a constraint in the design, that requires a journey to be made via a nominated station, before auto top-up can be enabled. There are a number of services such as Thames Clippers, for which this initiation transaction is not offered.

Whenever the pay as you go balance falls below £10, £20 or £40 is added to the balance automatically when the Oyster card is touched on an entry validator. A light on the Oyster reader flashes to indicate the Auto top-up has taken place and an email is sent to confirm the transaction. Payment is then taken from the registered debit or credit card.

To ensure successful transactions, customers must record any changes to their billing address and update their debit or credit card details as necessary.

Oyster photocards 
Oyster photocards, with an image of the authorised user on the card front, are issued to members of groups eligible for free or discounted travel. The cards are encoded to offer discounted fares and are available for students in full-time education (30% off season tickets), 16+ cards (half the adult-rate for single journeys on the Underground, London Overground, DLR and a limited number of National Rail services, discounted period Travelcards, free travel on buses and trams for students that live and attend full-time education in London) and for children under 16 years old (free travel on buses and trams and discounted single fares on the Underground, London Overground, DLR and most National Rail services). A 'Bus & Tram' Discount Card is specifically given to disadvantaged and 'unwaged' groups, primarily those on 'Job Seekers Allowance', 'Employment Support Allowance' and receivers of a variety of disabilities allowances, at half-fare rates for bus and tram services only; these cards simply charge the full rate on journeys not included in the discount scheme.

Student cards 
Student Oyster photocards offering a 30% discount on period tickets, are available to full-time students over 18 at registered institutions within the area of the M25 motorway, an area slightly larger than Greater London, at a cost of £20. Until the 2009–10 academic year, they cost £5 but required replacing each year of multiple-year courses.  There is no discount for Pay-as-you-go, although many students hold the National Rail 16–25 Railcard, which can be added to an Oyster card at an Underground station ticket office to obtain a 1/3 reduction on off-peak caps and a 1/3 discount on off-peak Oyster single fares on all rail services. (NB peak National Rail fares may be cheaper with discounted paper tickets).  A small selection of universities outside London have also registered on the scheme.

A replacement for lost or stolen cards costs £10 and involves applying for a replacement card online or by calling the Oyster helpline. A new photograph is not required. The funds and remaining travelcard is transferable to a new student Oyster photocard.

Since 8 September 2006, students at some London universities have been able to apply for their 18+ Oyster photocard online by uploading a digital photograph and paying with a credit or debit card.

Zip cards 
On 7 January 2008, Transport for London unveiled the Zip card, an Oyster photocard to be used by young people aged 18 years or under who qualify for free bus and tram travel within the capital, with effect from 1 June 2008. To qualify, one must live in a London borough (and still be in full-time education if they are 18). Children outside London (and indeed the UK) may also apply for a Visitor version of the Zip card (which offers free bus and tram travel for under-16s, and half-rate fares for 16–18-year-olds) online, which they must collect from one of TfL's Travel Information Centres. From 1 September 2010 a fee of £10-15 (Dependent on age) has been charged for the card.

Freedom Passes and 60+ Oyster Cards 
Freedom Passes are generally issued on what is in technical terms an Oyster card, though it does not bear that name. Freedom passes are free travel passes available to Greater London residents who are over a specified age (60 until March 2010, increasing in phases to 66 from March 2020) or with a disability specified in the Transport Act 2000; individual London boroughs have exceptional discretion to issue Freedom Passes to disabled people who do not meet the national statutory requirements (though they have to fund them). Travel is free at all times on the Tube, DLR, buses and Tramlink, and after 09:30 on most National Rail journeys entirely within the Greater London boundary. Holders cannot put any money or ticket products on a Freedom Pass; to travel outside these times, a separate Oyster card or other valid ticket is required.

Residents who are over 60 but who do not qualify for a Freedom Pass can obtain a similar 60+ Oyster Card for a single fee. The outer boundary of the area in which Freedom Passes and 60+ Oyster Cards can be used is mostly the same as the area within which ordinary Oyster Cards can be used. This is because National Express East Anglia took the decision to accept Oyster PAYG only as far as Broxbourne. Cards also have to be visually inspected on any non-TfL buses whose routes accept the concessionary cards on journeys partly entering Greater London including routes equipped with readers that accept the national standard ITSO bus pass cards with which Oyster is not compatible.

Freedom Passes issued to qualifying persons are also an English National Concessionary Bus Pass.  They look identical to concessionary bus passes but are additionally marked "Freedom Pass" with the word "Pass" in red.  Unlike the Freedom pass, the 60+ Oyster card is not valid for concessionary travel outside of the area approved by the Greater London Authority. This is because the concessionary bus travel scheme is centrally funded by government, but the Oyster 60+ and the Freedom Pass's validity on Tube, tram and rail networks is funded locally by the Greater London Authority.

Oyster and credit card 

A credit card variant of the Oyster card was launched by Barclaycard in September 2007 and is called OnePulse. The card combines standard Oyster card functionality with Visa credit card facilities. The Barclaycard OnePulse incorporates contactless payment technology, allowing most transactions up to £20 to be carried out without the need to enter a PIN (unlike the Chip and PIN system).

In 2005, Transport for London shortlisted two financial services suppliers, Barclaycard and American Express, to add e-money payment capability to the Oyster card. Barclaycard was selected in December 2006 to supply the card, but the project was then temporarily shelved. The OnePulse card was later launched using a combination of Oyster and Visa, but with no e-money functionality.

In February 2014, Barclaycard announced that the OnePulse card would be withdrawn from use and all functionality would cease after 30 June 2014. This came about due to the Oyster readers now also recognizing contactless Oyster cards and the presence of both Visa PayWave and the Oyster Contactless functionality on the card will cause a 'card clash'.  Customers had their OnePulse card replaced with the Freedom Rewards credit card.

Validity 
A number of different ticket types can be held on an Oyster card, and validity varies across the different transport modes within London.

 = Valid within the advertised TfL fare zones.
 = Not valid.
 = Elizabeth line: Not valid between West Drayton and Reading.
 = River: PAYG only available on Thames Clipper; Travelcards only provide discount, not valid for travel.
 = London Cable Car: Travelcards only provide discount, not valid for travel.
!   =  must include Zone 3, 4, 5 or 6
‡ = PAYG is valid on Heathrow Express, Gatwick Express and Southeastern High Speed services between London St Pancras and Stratford International, but special fares apply which don't count into any caps nor allow transferring between other National Rail services in a single journey.

TfL services 
Oyster is operated by Transport for London and has been valid on all London Underground, London Buses, DLR and London Tramlink services since its launch in 2003, and on all London Overground services since their start of operation. However, Oyster is not accepted on Elizabeth line west of West Drayton towards Reading, which is the only TfL service not accepting Oyster.

National Rail 
The introduction of Oyster pay as you go on the National Rail commuter rail network in London was phased in gradually over a period of about six years (see Roll-out history). Since January 2010, PAYG has been valid on all London suburban rail services which accept Travelcards. Additionally, PAYG may be used at a selected number of stations which lie just outside the zones. New maps were issued in January 2010 which illustrates where PAYG is now valid.

Certain limitations remain on National Rail, however. Airport services Stansted Express and Thameslink Luton Airport services all run outside the Travelcard zones, so PAYG is not valid on those services either.

Heathrow Express accepts Oyster pay as you go since 19 February 2019.

In November 2007, the metro routes operated by Silverlink were brought under the control of TfL and operated under the brand name London Overground. From the first day of operation, Oyster PAYG became valid on all Overground routes.

London Oyster Cards and contactless cards will be accepted on many Southern, Gatwick Express and Thameslink services in early 2016. These include to Gatwick Airport station and five other Surrey railway stations, as well as to Luton Airport.

London River Services 
Since 23 November 2009, Oyster PAYG has been valid on London River Services boats operated by Thames Clippers only. Oyster cards are accepted for all Thames Clippers scheduled services, the DoubleTree Docklands ferry, the "Tate to Tate" service and the O2 Express. Discounts on standard fares are offered to Oyster cardholders, except on the O2 Express. The daily price capping guarantee does not apply to journeys made on Thames Clippers.

London Cable Car 
Oyster card holders (PAYG, Travelcard or Freedom Pass) receive discounts on the London Cable Car across the River Thames between Greenwich and the Royal Docks, which opened in June 2012. Like London River Services, the cable car is a privately funded concern and is not fully integrated into TfL's ticketing system. To encourage use of the cable car as a commuter service, substantial discounts are offered with a "frequent flyer" ticket which allows 10 journeys within 12 months.

Pricing 
Pricing below is correct 

The pricing system is fairly complex, and changes from time to time. The most up to date fares can be found on Transport for London's FareFinder website.

Adult single fares 
Cash is no longer accepted on London's buses and trams and, in order to encourage passengers to use Oyster or contactless, cash fares for tubes and trains are generally much more expensive than PAYG fares.  A contactless debit or credit card can be used in place of an Oyster card at the same fare.

The single Oyster fare for a bus or tram journey is £1.65, although the Hopper fare rules allow unlimited bus and tram journeys within one hour of first touching in for no additional cost. Passengers need to touch in using the same card on all the bus and tram journeys made and any free fares are applied automatically.

Using PAYG, a single trip on the tube within zone 1 costs £2.50 (compared to £6.30 if paid by cash). Tube journeys within any other single zone cost £1.80 at peak times and £1.60 off peak (£6.30 for cash at any time). Journeys in multiple zones are progressively more expensive.

However, even for journeys passing through the same zones, the price may be different depending on the actual line(s) used. For example, a journey from Willesden Junction to Wimbledon has 5 different routes, 3 of them involving travel between zones 1-3 and 2 of them within zones 2-3 only, defined in the route database. If travel is made by changing at  onto the District line by touching the pink reader there, the fare charged is only £2.00 peak / £1.70 off-peak, while if a touch is not made there, travel is assumed to be via  onto the South Western Railway which is on a more expensive fare scale than the tube even though the trips are within the same zones. Similarly, travelling via zone 1 is more expensive if a change onto the South Western Railway is made at  compared to using the tube all the way from  via Earl's Court.

Travel to Heathrow Airport via Elizabeth line is more expensive than going via the tube even though both the tube and the Elizabeth line stations are in zone 6.

For every possible journey, there is a default route, possibly with other routes distinguished by intermediate touches, in the fare database. Each route has an associated "zones travelled" label which are the zones assumed to be travelled through. When touching out at a reader, the system looks up the appropriate route from the database according to the touches, which is the default route if no intermediate touches are made or if they don't match any of the alternative routes, to charge the correct fare, and to record the assumed zones travelled into the card for capping purpose.

The zoned fare system under which Oyster operates inevitably gives rise to some quirks in the fares charged.  A 21 stop journey between Stratford and Clapham Junction on the overground is charged at £1.80 at peak times (£1.60 off peak) whereas a 1 stop journey between Whitechapel and Shoreditch High Street on the overground costs £2.50 at all times. This occurs because Shoreditch High Street is the only station in zone 1 on its line, whereas the entire Stratford to Clapham Junction line runs in zone 2 only. The cash fare is £6.30 in both cases and at all times. Similar anomalies are a feature of zoned fare systems worldwide.

Fare capping 
A 'capping' system was introduced on 27 February 2005, which means that an Oyster card will be charged no more than the nearest equivalent Day Travelcard for a day's travel, if penalty fares are not incurred. The daily cap is £7.70 within zones 1-2 and £14.10 within zones 1–6, provided no penalty fares are incurred for failure to touch in or out, or for touching in or out at the same station. A lower cap of £4.95 applies if the day's journeys are restricted to buses and trams only.

There are 3 different caps in use: all-day cap (valid from 04:30 weekdays to 04:29 the next day on all rail, tram and bus services), off-peak cap (valid from 09:30 weekdays / 04:30 weekends to 04:29 the next day on all rail, tram and bus services) and bus & tram cap (valid from 04:30 to 04:29 the next day on buses and trams only). For both the all-day cap and off-peak cap, the respective zones travelled are recorded onto the card.

The Oyster system supports up to 15 zones.

Because of how the price capping works, it can sometimes result in overcharging compared to using multiple Oyster cards. For example, if one takes a journey from zone 6 all the way to zone 1, then takes multiple journeys within zones 1-2, the system will charge for the journeys until the zone 1-6 cap is reached even though it may be cheaper to charge a zone 1-2 cap combined with a single fare from zone 6 because zone 1-6 travel is already recorded on the card. Contactless users don't suffer from this problem as fare calculation is done at the backend after the day of travel, where the cheapest combination of fares is charged. TfL is working on a similar system for Oyster as well such that overcharged fares may be refunded afterwards. The complex interaction between single fares and the various caps may also mean that, by deliberately taking an extra bus journey, the total fare for the day may be reduced.

Price capping does not apply to PAYG fares on Heathrow Express, Gatwick Express, London River Services boats and on Southeastern high speed train services.

Railcard discount 
Holders of Disabled Persons, HM Forces, Senior, 16–25, 26-30 National Rail Railcards and Annual Gold Cards (as of 23 May 2010) receive a 34% reduction in the off-peak PAYG fares and price cap; Railcard discounts can be loaded on at London Underground ticket machines (with help from a member of staff).

Bus and tram discount 
On 20 August 2007, a 'Bus and Tram Discount photocard' was launched for London Oyster card users who received Income Support. It allows cardholders to pay £0.75 for a single bus journey (capped at £2.25 per day), and to buy half price period bus passes.

This was originally the result of a deal between Transport for London and Petróleos de Venezuela to provide fuel for London Buses at a 20% discount. In return Transport for London agreed to open an office in the Venezuelan capital Caracas to offer expertise on town planning, tourism, public protection and environmental issues. The deal with Venezuela was ended by Mayor Boris Johnson shortly after he took office, and the Bus and Tram Discount photocard scheme closed to new applications on 20 August 2008; Johnson said that "TfL will honour the discount [on existing cards] until the six-month time periods on cards have run out".

The Bus and Tram Discount Scheme reopened on 2 January 2009, this time funded by London fare payers. The scheme has been extended to people receiving Employment and Support Allowance (ESA) and to those receiving Jobseeker's Allowance for 13 weeks or more.

River Bus discounts 
Boats operated by Thames Clippers offer a 10% discount on standard fares to Oyster PAYG users, except on their O2 Express service, and a 1/3 discount to passengers carrying Oyster cards which have been loaded with a valid period Travelcard.

Penalty fares and maximum Oyster fare 
In order to prevent "misuse" by a stated 2% of passengers, from 19 November 2006 pay as you go users are automatically charged the "maximum Oyster fare" for a journey on that network when they touch in.  Depending on the journey made, the difference between this maximum fare and the actual fare due is automatically refunded to the user's Oyster card upon touching out.  The maximum fare is automatically charged to a passenger who touches out without having first touched in. Two maximum fares are charged (one for touching in, one for touching out) if a passenger touches in at a station, waits for over twenty minutes, and then touches out at the same station, because the system assumes that the passenger has been able to travel to another station in that time, taking no account of situations where there are severe delays.

Users must touch in and out even if the ticket barriers are open. At stations where Oyster is accepted but that do not have ticket barriers, an Oyster validator will be provided for the purposes of touching in and out. The maximum Oyster fare applies even if the daily price cap has been reached as this does not count towards the cap.

Maximum Oyster fares may be contested by telephone to the Oyster helpline on 0343 222 1234 or via email. This involves providing the Oyster card number and the relevant journey details; further journeys appearing on the card are helpful to validate the user's claim.

If the claim is accepted then the maximum Oyster fare minus the cost of the journey will be refunded. The user will be asked to nominate and make a journey from a specific Tube, DLR, London Overground or National Rail station, or Tram stop. On touching in or out, the refund is loaded to the card. The only way to collect a refund is as part of an actual journey, otherwise a further penalty fare is charged. This is because when the passenger touches the reader with their Oyster card, not only will the refund go on to the card, but a new journey will start.

The start date to pick up the refund can be the next day (at the earliest) and the refund will remain at the nominated station for 8 days in total. The customer does have the option to delay the start date for up to 8 days, and the refund will still remain at the gate for up to 8 further days. After this time the refund will be deleted from the gate line, and the customer will have to re-request the refund.

Customers claiming a refund must do so within 28 days of the overcharge.

Oyster users who do not touch in before making a journey may be liable to pay a penalty fare (£80) and/or reported for prosecution if caught by a revenue protection inspector.

Refunds for delayed journeys 
Commuters who were delayed 15 minutes or more on the Tube & DLR, and 30 minutes or more on London Overground & TfL Rail, are eligible to claim a refund for the cost of their journey. Commuters with Travelcards that do not pay for individual journeys will be refunded the Pay As You Go price of that single delayed journey. Customers wishing to claim these refunds must create an online TfL account, and then either manually claim online each time they are delayed, or use the free Train Reeclaim tool which automatically detects delayed TfL journeys and claims a refund on behalf of the commuter for each one.

Roll-out history 
The roll-out of Oyster features and migration from the paper-based system has been phased. Milestones so far have been:

 London Underground ticket barriers, bus ticket machines, Docklands Light Railway stations and Tramlink stops fitted with validators. Cards issued to Transport for London, London Underground, and bus operator staff (2002)
 Cards issued to the public for annual and monthly tickets (2003)
 Freedom Passes issued on Oyster (2004)
 Pay as you go (PAYG, first called 'prepay') launched on London Underground, DLR, and the parts of National Rail where Underground fares had previously been valid. (January 2004)
 Off-Peak Oyster single fares launched (January 2004)
 Annual tickets available only on Oyster (2004)
 Monthly tickets available only on Oyster, unless purchased from a station operated by a train company rather than TfL (2004)
 Payg on buses (May 2004)
 Daily price capping (February 2005)
 Student Oyster Photocards for students over 18 (early 2005)
 Oyster Child Photocards for under 16s—free travel on buses and reduced fares on trains (August 2005)
 Automatic top-up (September 2005)
 Weekly tickets available only on Oyster (September 2005)
 Oyster single fares cost up to 33% less than paper tickets (January 2006)
 Auto top-up on buses and trams (June 2006)
 Journey history for Pay as you go transactions available online (July 2006)
 Ability for active and retired railway staff who have a staff travel card to obtain privilege travel fares on the Underground with Oyster (July 2006)
 £4 or £5 'maximum cash fare' charged for Pay as you go journeys without a 'touch in' and 'touch out' (November 2006)
 Oyster card for visitors branded cards launched and sold by Gatwick Express.
 Oyster PAYG extended to London Overground (11 November 2007)
 Holders of Railcards (but not Network Railcard) can link their Railcard to Oyster to have PAYG capped at 34% below the normal rate since 2 January 2008.
 Oyster PAYG can be used to buy tickets on river services operated by Thames Clipper (23 November 2009)
 Oyster PAYG extended to National Rail (2 January 2010)
 Contactless cards can be used on London Buses (End of 2012)
 Cash no longer accepted on buses.  Cash ticket machines removed from bus stops in central London (Summer 2014)
 Contactless cards can be used on London Underground, Docklands Light Railway, London Overground and National Rail service. Weekly capping introduced on contactless cards. (September 2014)
 Apple Pay, Android Pay and Samsung Pay accepted. (September 2014)
 'One Day Bus and Tram Pass' introduced in 2015. Can be used for a maximum of one day only and can not be reloaded with credit. Allows the user to have unlimited journeys on buses and trams. (March 2015)
 Online top ups ready to collect at any station or on any bus within 30 minutes - previously users had to nominate a station and collect next day. Collection on buses was also unavailable (July 2017) 
 Official TfL Oyster card app introduced for iOS and Android devices (August 2017) 
 'Hopper Fare' introduced whereby users can make 2 journeys for £1.50 within 1 hour. This was improved in 2018 with the ability to make unlimited journeys within 1 hour for the same fare (January 2018)

Roll-out on National Rail 

The National Rail network is mostly outside the control of Transport for London, and passenger services are run by number of independent rail companies. Because of this, acceptance of Oyster PAYG on National Rail services was subject to the policy of each individual company and the roll-out of PAYG was much slower than on TfL services. For the first six years of Oyster, rollout on National Rail was gradual and uneven, with validity limited to specific lines and stations.

Several rail companies have accepted London Underground single fares because they duplicate London Underground routes, and they adopted the Oyster PAYG on those sections of the line which run alongside the Underground. When TfL took over the former Silverlink Metro railway lines, PAYG was rolled out on the first day of operation of London Overground. As a consequence, some rail operators whose services run parallel to London Overground lines were forced to accept PAYG, although only after some initial hesitation.

The process of persuading the various rail firms involved a long process of negotiation between the London Mayors and train operating companies. In 2005 Ken Livingstone (then Mayor of London) began a process of trying to persuade National Rail train operating companies to allow Oyster PAYG on all of their services within London, but a dispute about ticketing prevented this plan from going ahead.
After further negotiations, Transport for London offered to fund the train operating companies with £20m to provide Oyster facilities in London stations; this resulted in an outline agreement to introduce PAYG acceptance across the entire London rail network.

TfL announced a National Rail rollout date of May 2009, but negotiation with the private rail firms continued to fail and the rollout was delayed to 2010. Oyster readers were installed at many National Rail stations across London, but they remained covered up and not in use. In November 2009 it was finally confirmed that PAYG would be valid on National Rail from January 2010. The rollout was accompanied by the introduction of a new system of Oyster Extension Permits to allow travelcard holders to travel outside their designated zones on National Rail. This system was introduced to address the revenue protection concerns of the rail companies, but it was criticised for its complexity, and was abolished on 22 May 2011.

Impact 
Since the introduction of the Oyster card, the number of customers paying cash fares on buses has dropped dramatically. In addition, usage of station ticket offices has dropped, to the extent that in June 2007, TfL announced that a number of their ticket offices would close, with some others reducing their opening hours. TfL suggested that the staff would be 're-deployed' elsewhere on the network, including as train drivers.

In August 2010 the issue of the impact of the Oyster card on staffing returned.  In response to The National Union of Rail, Maritime and Transport Workers (RMT) ballot for a strike over planned job cuts, TfL stated that the increase in people using Oyster electronic ticketing cards meant only one in 20 journeys now involved interaction with a ticket office. As a result, it aims to reduce staff in ticket offices and elsewhere while deploying more workers to help passengers in stations.

Usage statistics 
By June 2010 over 34 million cards have been issued of which around 7 million are in regular use. More than 80% of all tube journeys and more than 90% of all bus journeys use Oyster. Around 38% of all Tube journeys and 21% of all bus journeys are made using Oyster pay as you go. Use of single tickets has declined and stands at roughly 1.5% of all bus journeys and 3% of all Tube journeys.

Since the launch of contactless payment in 2012, over 500 million journeys have been made using contactless, using over 12 million contactless bank cards.

In , over 12 million Oyster cards and 35 million contactless cards were used, generating around £5bn in ticketing revenue.

Future

Beyond London 

With regard to London's airports, TfL and BAA studied acceptance of Oyster Pay As You Go on BAA's Heathrow Express service and the Southern-operated Gatwick Express service in 2006, but BAA decided not to go ahead.

Oyster was extended to Hertford East when London Overground took over suburban services previously operated by Greater Anglia in May 2015.

Oyster was extended to Epsom, Hertford North, Potters Bar and Radlett in Summer 2019.

Contactless payment  
In 2014, Transport for London became the first public transport provider in the world to accept payment from contactless bank cards. TfL first started accepting contactless debit and credit cards on London Buses on 13 December 2012, expanding to the Underground, Tram and the Docklands Light Railway in September 2014. Since 2016, contactless payment can also take place using contactless-enabled mobile devices such as phones and smartwatches, using Apple Pay, Google Pay and Samsung Pay.

TfL designed and coded the contactless payment system in-house, at a cost of £11m, after realising existing commercial solutions were inflexible or too focused on retail use. Since the launch of contactless payment in 2012, over 500 million journeys have been made, using over 12 million contactless bank cards. Consequently, TfL is now one of Europe's largest contactless merchants, with around 1 in 10 contactless transactions in the UK taking place on the TfL network.

In 2016, TfL licensed their contactless payment system to Cubic, the original developers of the Oyster card, allowing the technology to be sold to other transport providers worldwide. In 2017, licensing deals were signed with New York City, New South Wales and Boston.

The same requirement to touch in and out on underground services applies to contactless cards.  The same price capping that applies to the use of Oyster cards applies to the use of contactless cards (provided the same card is used for the day's journeys).  The fare paid every day is settled with the bank and appears on the debit or credit card statement. Detailed usage data is written to Transport for London's systems and is available for customers who register their contactless cards with Transport for London. Unlike an Oyster card, a contactless card does not store credit (beyond the holder's credit limit) and there is no need or facility to add credit to the card.

An Oyster card can have a longer term "season" ticket loaded onto it (either at a ticket office or on line). Such a ticket can start on any day and be valid for a minimum of seven days and a maximum of one year. Unlike an Oyster card, a contactless card can automatically apply a seven-day travel card rate. If the card is regularly used between any Monday to Sunday period, an automatic cap is applied. The seven-day period is fixed at Monday to Sunday, it cannot be any seven-day period, unlike a seven-day ticket applied to an Oyster card. There is currently no automatic cap for longer periods.

Since the Oyster readers cannot write to a contactless card, the reader when touching out is unable to display the fare charged for the journey, as the card does not have the starting point stored in it. This is calculated overnight once the touch in and touch out information is downloaded from the gates and collated. When a touch in with a contactless card is made, the validity of the card is checked by debiting the card account with 10 pence. The final fare charged excludes this initial charge. As with Oyster, a failure to touch either in or out, charges the maximum possible fare. Transport for London state that if ticket inspection is taking place, it is then necessary to present the contactless card to the ticket inspector's portable oyster card reader. As the reader at the starting station cannot write to the contactless card and the card's use is not downloaded until the following night, it is not clear how the isolated portable card reader can determine if the card was used to touch into the system.

App 
In late 2017, TfL introduced the Oyster card app which allows users to check their balance on a compatible Android or iOS smartphone. The app is free to download and users can top up their Oyster card on the go or check journey history. Top ups are available to collect at any London Underground station or bus within 30 minutes. The app also has a notification feature which alerts users when their balance is below a specified amount.

First generation Oyster cards are not compatible with the app and TfL recommends users to upgrade their cards to newer ones to use them in the app.

Visual design

Designs 

Trial versions, Transport for London staff versions and the first version of the standard Oyster card for the public were released with the roundels on the front of the cards in red. Standard issues of the Oyster card have been updated since the first public release in order to meet TfL's Design Standards.

There have been three issues of the standard Oyster card, including the original red roundel issue, but all three Oyster cards have retained their original dimensions of 85mm x 55mm, with Oyster card number and reference number located in the top right-hand corner and bottom right hand corner of the back of the card respectively, along with the terms and conditions.

The second issue of the standard Oyster card had 'Transport for London' branding on the back of the card, with the Mayor of London (having replaced the 'LONDON' branding in the blue segment of the card's back). The roundel on the front of the card was changed from the colour red to white, as white was seen to represent Transport for London (whereas a red roundel is more known to represent London Buses).

The most recent issue of the standard Oyster card has TfL branding on its front, removed from the back of the card in the previous issue. The Mayor of London branding has also been moved from the blue segment on the back of the card to underneath the terms and conditions, where it is more prominent.

Oyster card holder/wallet 
With the release of the Oyster card, TfL released an accompanying Oyster card holder to replace the existing designs, previously sponsored by companies such as Yellow Pages, Direct Line and IKEA, as well as London Underground's and London Buses own releases of the holder which came without advertising.

The official Oyster branded holders have been redesigned on several occasions, keeping up with various iterations of the card and to increase service awareness. The initial version mimicked the blue design of the card itself, and was later modified to include the line "Please reuse your card" on the front.

In March 2007 the Oyster card wallet was designed by British designers including Katharine Hamnett, Frostfrench and Gharani Strok for Oxfam's I'm In campaign to end world poverty. The designer wallets were available for a limited period of time from Oxfam's street teams in London who handed them out to people who signed up to the I'm In movement. Also, to celebrate 100 years of the Piccadilly line, a series of limited edition Oyster card wallets were commissioned from selected artists from the Thin Cities Platform for Art project. The previous wallets handed out were sponsored by IKEA who also sponsor the tube map, and did not display the Oyster or the London Underground logos.

In late 2007 the standard issue wallets were redesigned with the only changes being the colour scheme changing from blue to black, and the removal of the resemblance to the Oyster card.

The most recent variation of the wallet came with the introduction of contactless payment acceptance on the network in 2012, where light-green "Watch out for card clash" wallets have been issued to raise awareness of "card clash", and replace the previous simplistic designs. The inside of these wallets reads "Only touch one card on the reader" on the clear plastic.

In 2015 Mel Elliot won the London Design Awards with her "Girls Night Out" themed wallet.

In addition to the official wallets distributed by TfL, which may or may not carry advertising for a sponsor, Oyster card holders and wallets are sometimes used as a marketing tool by other organisations seeking to promote their identity or activities. Such items are normally given away free, either with products or handed out to the public.

Although customers are usually given a free wallet when purchasing a card, the wallets themselves, including the most recent design issue, can be picked up for free at most stations or newsagents.

In September 2019 TfL announced that they were discontinuing their free Oyster Card wallets citing the cost and also the use of plastic.

Staff cards 
The standard public Oyster card is blue but colour variants are used by transport staff. Similar cards are issued to police officers.

Variants 
The standard Oyster card designs are as follows:
 Standard Oyster card, Blue: Design has remained mostly the same since its introduction in 2003, but very minor text changes on the reverse continue to occur. These are issued when limited edition cards are not in circulation
 One Day Bus and Tram Pass, Green: Introduced in January 2015, this card carries the "Oyster" branding and can only be used for a maximum of one day, as it can not be reloaded with credit. It is half the thickness of a standard Oyster card, as it is meant to be discarded when it expires. The card allows the user unlimited travel on bus and tram until the next day.
 Visitor Oyster Card: A visitor card is designed for use by tourists to London and can be delivered to their home address before they arrive.  Tourists can benefit from special offers and discounts and save money in leading London restaurants, shops and entertainment venues on presentation of this card.  A discount is also offered on the London Cable Car service.

A number of limited edition Oyster card variant designs exist. These are produced in limited quantities but otherwise function as standard Oyster cards. These include:
 2011 Wedding of Prince William and Catherine Middleton. (750k produced) 
 2012 Queen Elizabeth II's Diamond Jubilee Portrait Version. (250k issued) 
 2012 Queen Elizabeth II's Diamond Jubilee Buckingham Palace Edition. (1.5m issued) 
 2012 London 2012 Games - various designs listed below.
 2012 150th Anniversary of London Underground. (1m produced) 
 2014 TfL Year of the Bus. (1.4m produced) 
 2018 Adidas x TfL (3 variations with 500 of each produced).
 2022 Adidas Arsenal (1000 produced) 
 2022 Elizabeth Line

In 2012, TfL released various cards to mark the Olympic Games taking place in London that year. The cards performed the same as any other card and also include all the same text, apart from a differentiating line (listed below), and the London 2012 logo. Cards like these were distributed solely to select 2012 volunteers who took part in the opening and closing ceremonies.
They were used for the duration of the games and therefore are no longer valid for use on the transport system. The colour of these Oyster cards is pink with a coloured stripe:
"London Olympic Games", Pink stripe.
"London Paralympic Games", Blue stripe.
 "Olympic Volunteer", Green stripe.
 "Paralympic Volunteer" , Orange Stripe.
 "2012 Ceremonies Volunteer", Purple stripe.

Three design variations of the Oyster visitor cards also exist:
 2007 Tutankhamun and the Golden Age of the Pharaohs exhibition at the O2.
 2007 Standard version showing the London Eye, St Paul's Cathedral, 30 St Mary Axe and the Millennium Bridge.
 2012 Visitor Oyster card containing letters made up of landmarks spelling LONDON.

Collaborations 

In October 2018, TfL partnered with Adidas to celebrate 15 years of the Oyster card. A limited number of trainers from the "Oyster Club pack" went on sale on with each of the three types costing £80 and being based on an element of the Tube's history. These designs include Temper Run, ZX 500RM and Continental 80. Only 500 limited-edition Oyster cards were produced, and each type of trainer contains a different card design in the box. Also included with the trainers is a genuine leather case (with TfL and Adidas logo engraving) and a credit of £80 preloaded on the Oyster card.

Issues and criticisms

Touching out penalties 
Card users sometimes forget to touch in or touch out, are unable to find the yellow readers or it may be too crowded to touch out. Such card users have either received penalty fares by revenue inspectors, been charged a maximum cash fare, or been prosecuted in courts which can issue high penalties. Card users are also penalised for touching in and out of the same station within a two-minute period, and charged the maximum possible fare from that station.

The system also applies two penalty fares (one for touching in, and one for touching out) to passengers who touch in and touch out at the same station after 20 minutes; this is due to the system assuming that, after such a long delay, the passenger has travelled to another station and returned without touching in or out at the other station, when in reality the passenger might simply have been waiting for a train, baulked at the long waiting time and exited.

Extension fares 
Holders of Travelcards can add pay-as-you-go credit on their Oyster cards. This credit is used as 'extension fare' when users travel beyond the zones in which their Travelcard is valid. This extension fare equals the regular Oyster fare for a journey from/to the respective station outside of the validity area of the Travelcard to/from the closest zone still covered by the Travelcard. To distinguish between peak and off-peak fares, however, the start of the journey is taken into account. That means travellers might be charged the (more expensive) peak fare as extension fare even if they had not yet left the area of validity of their Travelcard by the end of peak time.  Conversely, a journey starting in the covered zones shortly before the start of the peak time will be charged as off-peak.

There is an exploitable feature of the system, in that if a touch-in (or touch-out) is made in a zone where the oyster card is loaded with a valid season ticket or Travelcard but there is no associated touch-out (or touch-in), the system does not treat this as an unresolved journey. Although encouraged to do so, such ticket holders are not obliged to touch-in or touch-out within the zones of their ticket's validity (other than to operate a barrier). This means that a passenger holding (say) a valid zone 1&2 Travelcard, can touch-in at a zone 1 station (to open the ticket barrier) and then travel to a zone 3, 4, 5 or 6 station that does not have a barrier without touching out or paying the extension fare. Ticket inspectors frequently operate at such locations to catch these fare dodging passengers. Since the system maintains a record of every touch the card does make (even with a valid travelcard), TfL will assiduously seek to recover all the unpaid fares when a passenger who is caught is prosecuted for fare evasion.

Privacy 
The system has been criticised as a threat to the privacy of its users. Each Oyster card is uniquely numbered, and registration is required for monthly or longer tickets, which are no longer available on paper. Limited usage data is stored on the card. Journey and transaction history is held centrally by Transport for London for up to eight weeks, after which the transactions and journey history are disassociated from the Oyster card and cannot be re-associated; full registration details are held centrally and not on individual Oyster cards; recent usage can be checked by anyone in possession of the card at some ticket machines.

The police have used Oyster card data as an investigative tool, and this use is increasing. On 13 April 2006, TfL stated that "Between August 2004 and March 2006 TfL's Information Access and Compliance Team received 436 requests from the police for Oyster card information. Of these, 409 requests were granted and the data were released to the police." However, in response to another request in February 2012, "TfL said this had happened 5,295 times in 2008, 5,359 in 2009, 5,046 in 2010, and a record 6,258 in 2011".

Additionally, in 2008 news reports indicated that the security services were seeking access to all Oyster card data for the purposes of counter-terrorism. Such access is not provided to the security services.

As yet, there have been no reports of customer data being misused, outside the terms of the registration agreement. There have been no reports of Oyster data being lost.

Design 
The system has been criticised for usability issues in general system, website and top-up machine design.

Oyster pay-as-you-go users, on London Underground, DLR and National Rail (including London Overground) services are required always to "touch in" and "touch out" to cause the correct fare to be charged. This requirement is less obviously enforced at stations where there are only standalone yellow reader rather than ticket barriers. Without a physical barrier, pay-as-you-go users may simply forget to "touch in" or fail to touch their card correctly, which will result in a maximum fare being charged. Equally, if the barriers do not function (reading 'SEEK ASSISTANCE') and the TfL or train operating company staff member has to open the gates manually, then the maximum fare may be charged. If this occurs a refund may be requested by telephoning the Oyster helpline the day after the incident occurs (to allow time for the central computers to be updated); the overcharged amount can be added back to the pay-as-you-go balance on the card from the following day when the Oyster card is used to make a journey.

The use of Oyster cards on buses has been subject to criticism following a number of successful criminal prosecutions by TfL of bus passengers whose Oyster card, when checked by Revenue Protection Inspectors, did not show that the passenger had "touched in" correctly on boarding. In particular, problems have been highlighted in connection with the quality of error messages given to passengers when touching in has failed for any reason. In one case, a passenger successfully appealed against his conviction for fare evasion when the court noted that the passenger believed he had paid for his journey because the Oyster reader did not give sufficient error warning.

In 2011, London Assembly member Caroline Pidgeon obtained figures from the Mayor of London which revealed that in 2010, £60million had been taken by TfL in maximum Oyster fares. In her criticism of the figures, Pidgeon claimed that "structural problems" with the Oyster system were to blame, such as faulty equipment failing to register cards and difficulty in obtaining refunds. A report by BBC London highlighted the system of "autocomplete" (in which Oyster cards journeys are automatically completed without the need to physically touch out, exceptionally used when large crowds are exiting stations) as particularly problematic.

Technical faults 
In January 2004, on the day that the pay-as-you-go system went live on all Oyster cards, some season ticket passengers were prevented from making a second journey on their travelcard. Upon investigation each had a negative prepay balance. This was widely reported as a major bug in the system. However, the reason for the "bug" was that some season ticket holders were passing through zones not included on their tickets. The existing paper system could not prevent this kind of misuse as the barriers only checked if a paper ticket was valid in the zone the barrier was in.

On 10 March 2005 an incorrect data table meant that the Oyster system was inoperable during the morning rush hour. Ticket barriers had to be left open and pay as you go fares could not be collected.

On 12 July 2008 an incorrect data table disabled an estimated 72,000 Oyster cards, including Travelcards, staff passes, Freedom Passes, child Oyster cards and other electronic tickets. The Oyster system was shut down and later restarted during traffic hours. Some customers already in the system were overcharged. Refunds were given to those affected and all disabled cards were replaced. Freedom Pass holders had to apply to their local authority for replacement passes (as these are not managed by TfL).

A further system failure occurred two weeks later on 25 July 2008, when pay as you go cards were not read properly.

On 2 January 2016 the Oyster system failed, with readers failing to process Oyster cards but continuing to process contactless cards and Apple Pay transactions.

The difference between pay as you go and Travelcards 
Transport for London promoted the Oyster card at launch with many adverts seeking to portray it as an alternative to the paper Travelcard. In late 2005 the Advertising Standards Authority ordered the withdrawal of one such poster which claimed that Oyster pay as you go was "more convenient" than Travelcards with "no need to plan in advance". The ASA ruled that the two products were not directly comparable, mainly because the pay as you go facility was not valid on most National Rail routes at the time.

Transport for London has made a significant surplus from excess fares deducted for those travelling using PAYG and failing to touch out as they exit stations. According to information obtained under the Freedom of Information Act TfL made £32m from pay as you go cards of which £18m was maximum fares for failing to touch out. Only £803,000 was paid in refunds, showing that whilst customers can apply for a refund, most do not. The oyster online site does not list all penalty fares eligible for refunds on the front page, and users must search for fares charged on a particular day to discover all penalty fares that have been charged. The maximum fares for failing to touch out were introduced late 2006.

Validity on National Rail 
Until the availability of Oyster pay-as-you-go on the whole of the National Rail suburban network in January 2010, the validity of PAYG was not consistent across different modes of transport within London, and this gave rise to confusion for Oyster pay-as-you-go users. Many passengers were caught out trying to use Pay as you go on rail routes where it was not valid.

On some National Rail routes where pay-as-you-go was valid, Oyster validators had not been installed at some intermediate stations. While Oyster pay-as-you-go users could legally travel along those lines to certain destinations, they were not permitted to board or alight at intermediate stations. If their journey began or ended at an intermediate station, they would be unable to touch out and consequently be liable for penalty fares or prosecution.

The complexity of Oyster validity on these routes was criticised for increasing the risk of passengers inadvertently failing to pay the correct fare. Criticism was also levelled at train operating companies for failing to provide adequate warnings to passengers about Oyster validity on their routes and for not installing Oyster readers at certain stations.

TfL published guides to the limitations of pay-as-you-go validity diagrammatic maps illustrating PAYG validity were published in November 2006 by National Rail, but these were rarely on display at stations and had to be obtained from transport websites.

Online and telesales 
Oyster card ticket renewals and pay-as-you-go top-ups made online allow users to make purchases without the need to go to a ticket office or vending machine. However, there were certain limitations to this system:
 tickets and pay-as-you-go funds can only be added to the Oyster card from 30 minutes after purchase (if bought online);
 users must select a station or tram stop where they must touch in or out as part of a normal journey to complete the purchase (as cards cannot be credited remotely);
 users must nominate the station in advance – failure to enter or exit via this station means that the ticket is not added to the card;
 tickets purchased in this way could not be added from a bus reader (due to these not being fixed in a permanent location).

Now only the 30 minutes limitation, and the requirement to make a journey still exist. Users no longer need to select a station and can collect the ticket or top up made online at any stations, including on a bus, while making the next journey.

Security issues 
In June 2008, researchers at the Radboud University in Nijmegen, the Netherlands, who had previously succeeded in hacking the OV-chipkaart (the Dutch public transport chip card), hacked an Oyster card, which is also based on the MIFARE Classic chip. They scanned a card reader to obtain its cryptographic key, then used a wireless antenna attached to a laptop computer to brush up against passengers on the London Underground and extract the information from their cards. With that information they were able to clone a card, add credit to it, and use it to travel on the Underground for at least a day. The MIFARE chip manufacturers NXP Semiconductor sought a court injunction to prevent the publication of the details of this security breach, but this was overturned on appeal.

The Mifare Classic—which is also used as a security pass for controlling entry into buildings—has been criticised as having very poor security, and NXP criticised for trying to ensure security by obscurity rather than strong encryption. Breaching security on Oyster cards should not allow unauthorised use for more than a day, as TfL promises to turn off any cloned cards within 24 hours, but a cloned Mifare Classic can allow entry into buildings that use this system for security.

Strategic research 
Transport for London, in partnership with academic institutions such as MIT, has begun to use the data captured by the Oyster smartcard system for strategic research purposes, with the general goal of using Oyster data to gain cheap and accurate insights into the behaviour and experience of passengers. Specific projects include estimation of Origin-Destination Matrices for the London Underground, analysis of bus-to-bus and bus-to-tube interchange behaviour, modelling and analysis of TfL-wide fare policy changes, and measurement of service quality on the London Overground.

See also 

 Oyster card (pay as you go) on National Rail
Smartcards on National Rail
 List of smart cards
 Octopus Card
 Transit Access Pass (TAP), a similar smart card system used in Greater Los Angeles.
 OV-chipkaart, a similar smart card system used in the Netherlands
 Clipper Card, used in the San Francisco Bay Area
 Presto card
 Troika card
 Radio-frequency identification
 Opal card, used in New South Wales and based on the Oyster card
 Myki card, used in Victoria (Australia)

References

External links 

 

Contactless smart cards
Fare collection systems in London
Transport for London